Newgate is an arch bridge carrying the walkway of the city walls over Pepper Street in Chester, Cheshire, England.  It is recorded in the National Heritage List for England as a designated Grade II listed building.  The bridge was built in 1937-38 to relieve traffic congestion in the city, especially at Chester Cross.  This involved making a new breach in the city walls.

The bridge is constructed in red sandstone.  It was designed by Sir Walter Tapper and his son, Michael.  On each side of the bridge is a tower containing mock loops (unglazed slit windows) and surmounted by hipped roofs. Flights of steps on each side lead up to the towers and to the walkway across the top of the bridge.  The structure is decorated with carved shields and Tudor roses.  The historian Simon Ward expresses the opinion that "its design conformed to the generally medieval feel of the walls".

See also

Grade II listed buildings in Chester (central)

References

Arch bridges in the United Kingdom
Bridges in Cheshire
Grade II listed buildings in Chester
Bridges completed in 1938
Newgate
Stone bridges in the United Kingdom
Town Gates in England